Dasht-e Arzhan (also known as Dachte-Arjan, Dasht-e Arjan, Dasht-e Arzhaneh, and Dasht-i- Arjan) is a village in Dasht-e Arzhan Rural District, Arzhan District, Shiraz County, Fars Province, Iran. At the 2006 census, its population was 2,557, made up of 585 families. The village lies in an ecologically important zone, the Arzhan and Parishan Protected Area.

In the past, the Arjan Plain was ruled by the Kadkhoda of that place called Molamouli, who was tortured by Mushir at that time, and after him was Ali Khan Kushk, who was killed by the Iranian army during the reign of Reza Shah Pahlavi.  

The main language spoken in the village is Persian.

See also 
 Lake Arzhan
 Lake Maharloo

References 

 From Persian Wikipedia - 2020 

Populated places in Shiraz County